Buddies of Swing is an album by fiddle and mandolin player Peter Ostroushko, released in 1987.

Track listing 
 "Liza (All the Clouds'll Roll Away)" (George Gershwin, Ira Gershwin, Gus Kahn) – 4:15
"Indifference" (Joseph Colombo, Tony Murena) – 3:23
"Benny's/Pennies from Heaven" (Johnny Burke, Arthur Johnston) – 4:30
"Blues for Marian (Waltz of the Holsteins)" (Ostroushko) – 6:25
"Beaumont Rag" (Traditional) – 3:16
"Tico-Tico" (Jose Abreu, Ervin Drake, Aloysio Oliveira) – 2:23
"Bring on Some Rain" (Ostroushko) – 6:49
"Fats Waller Medley: Jitterbug Waltz/Ain't Misbehavin'/Lulus's Back In Town" (Dubin, Waller, Warren) – 7:24
"Honeysuckle Rose" (Andy Razaf, Fats Waller) – 6:29

Personnel
Peter Ostroushko – mandolin, fiddle, guitar, vocals
Jethro Burns – mandolin
Bruce Calin – bass
Johnny Gimble – fiddle, mandolin
Tim Hennessy – guitar
Prudence Johnson – vocals
Tom Lewis – bass
Red Maddock – drums
Dean Magraw – guitar
Butch Thompson – clarinet, piano

Production notes
Peter Ostroushko – producer
Eric Peltoniemi – producer
Bob Feldman – executive producer
Tom Mudge – engineer
Marge Ostroushko – assistant producer
John Scherf – assistant engineer
Judy Stone Nunneley – photography
Ann Marsden – photography
George Ostroushko – artwork, design

References

1987 albums
Peter Ostroushko albums
Red House Records albums